Juan Pablo Caffa (born 30 September 1984) is an Argentine former footballer who played as a left winger.

His nickname was "El violinista del Viaducto" (literally translated as "The violinist of the viaduct"), as he played an imaginary violin during his goal celebrations. His professional career, other than in his own country where he represented Boca Juniors, Ferro Carril Oeste and Arsenal de Sarandí (two spells), was spent in Spain, Greece, Uruguay, Ecuador and the United States.

Club career

Argentina
Born in Murphy, Santa Fe, Caffa was part of Club Atlético Boca Juniors youth system, being already with the first team when it won the 2003 Apertura, although he only featured in one league match.

In the following years, he played with Ferro Carril Oeste and Arsenal de Sarandí.

Spain
After a number of strong displays with Arsenal during the 2006 Apertura tournament, Caffa earned a €2 million transfer to Real Betis in the January 2007 transfer window. He played his first La Liga match on 4 February against Athletic Bilbao, but went scoreless in his six season appearances, also not finding the net in his first full campaign although he did not start regularly for the Andalusians.

In 2008–09, Caffa played on loan with Real Zaragoza, being an important attacking element as they returned to the first division after just one year out. Again at Betis, he appeared in 32 games – although only ten starts– and scored seven goals, but the club failed to regain top-flight status.

Return to Argentina
In early December 2010, Caffa bought out the remainder of his contract with Betis and returned to Argentina to his former team Arsenal, agreeing on a three-year contract.

Club statistics
 (asterisk signals statistics drawn from all competitions)

Honours
Arsenal Sarandí
Argentine Primera División: 2012 Clausura

References

External links
Argentine League statistics  

Statistics at Irish Times

1984 births
Living people
People from General López Department
Argentine footballers
Association football wingers
Argentine Primera División players
Boca Juniors footballers
Ferro Carril Oeste footballers
Arsenal de Sarandí footballers
La Liga players
Segunda División players
Real Betis players
Real Zaragoza players
Super League Greece players
Asteras Tripolis F.C. players
Uruguayan Primera División players
Defensor Sporting players
Ecuadorian Serie A players
L.D.U. Loja footballers
C.D. Universidad Católica del Ecuador footballers
USL Championship players
FC Tulsa players
Fresno FC players
Argentine expatriate footballers
Expatriate footballers in Spain
Expatriate footballers in Greece
Expatriate footballers in Uruguay
Expatriate footballers in Ecuador
Expatriate soccer players in the United States
Argentine expatriate sportspeople in Spain
Argentine expatriate sportspeople in Greece
Argentine expatriate sportspeople in Uruguay
Argentine expatriate sportspeople in Ecuador
Argentine expatriate sportspeople in the United States
Sportspeople from Santa Fe Province